Fukui Fumimasa (June 6, 1934 - May 4, 2017) was a Japanese Buddhist scholar-monk, Sinology scholar and Tendai monk; he was a monk in the highest grade.  He was the chief monk at Yuishinin Temple, a temple within Nikkozan Rinnō-ji Temple located at Nikkō, Tochigi Prefecture and was professor emeritus at Waseda University. His father was Fukui Kōjun, and his younger brother was Fukui Shigemasa.  Both father and brother were Asian Studies scholars and Tendai Buddhist monks.

Biography 
Fukui was born in Tokyo.  He went to Waseda University Junior and Senior High School and specialized in Asian Philosophy at Waseda University's Literature Department.  Fukui pursued advanced studies at Waseda and received both his Masters and Doctorate degrees there.  He went abroad to study in France and was a student of Paul Demiéville (1894-1979), Maxime Kaltenmark (1910-2002) and Rolf Stein (1911-1999).  Fukui later became a professor at Waseda University.  Fukui specialized in the historical philology of the Heart Sutra and the theories on the formation of Daoism. During the Cultural Revolution in China, he assisted many French sinologists in gaining access to research institutions, monasteries and universities in Japan.

In 1991, he was honored with the rank of chevalier in the French Ordre des Palmes académiques for his extraordinary scholastic merit. In 2014, he was honored with the Japanese Order of the Sacred Treasure. He was a member of the 17th and 18th Science Council of Japan.  From 1996 to 2004, he was the eighth president of Waseda University's Young Buddhist Association. He retired at age 70.

Forty-eight Japanese essays were written to honor Fukui Fumimasa on his seventieth birthday and retirement in Philosophy and Ritual in the Asian Culture - Essays in honour of Dr Fumimasa-Bunga Fukui on his seventieth birthday along with a brief biography.

Selected bibliography

Sole author

Works co-authored

Translations by Fukui Fumimasa

Translations by Other Authors of Works by Fukui Fumimasa

Notes

References

Sources

External links
 CiNii>福井文雅 (in Japanese)
 INBUDS>福井文雅 (in Japanese)

2017 deaths
1934 births
People from Tokyo Metropolis
Waseda University alumni
Academic staff of Waseda University
Japanese sinologists
Japanese Buddhist clergy
Japanese orientalists
Japanese scholars of Buddhism